This article contains a list of the top 50 accounts with the largest number of followers on the social media platform Facebook. As of December 2022, the most-followed page is Facebook App's page with more than 185 million. The most-followed person is Portuguese footballer Cristiano Ronaldo, with over 160 million followers as of December 2022.

Most-followed Facebook pages 
The following table lists the 50 most-followed pages on Facebook , with each total rounded down to the nearest million followers, as well as the description, and the country of origin of each page.

See also 
 List of most-followed Instagram accounts

References 

Facebook
Facebook-related lists
Facebook